Abbas Mohamad (born 15 June 1998) is a footballer who last played for GAIS Göteborg as a defender. Born in Sweden, he is an international for the Iraq national team.

Career
Mohamad is a youth product of Borås Kings, Elfsborg and Kronängs. He began his senior career in the Superettan with Norrby in 2015. On 9 March 2016, he extended his contract with Norrby for 2 more years. On 9 August 2017, he joined Dalstorps on loan for the season. In 2018, he again extended his contract for 3 more years and went on loan with Vårgårda. He transferred to Dalkurd on 1 August 2022.

On 12 December 2022, he joined GAIS on a two year contract. Later that month, Mohamad made social media posts supporting controversial internet personality Andrew Tate, after Tate's arrest for human trafficking. On New Years Eve, GAIS released a statement saying that the club did not share his viewpoints and would be discussing his social media usage. Mohamad continued to make social media posts supporting Tate and on 7 January 2023, GAIS released a statement saying that he was no longer part of the club.

International career
Born in Sweden, Mohamad is of Iraqi descent. He was called up to the senior Iraq national team team for the  2022 Jordan International Tournament. On 23 September 2022, Alai made his first team debut for Iraq in a penalty shootout loss against Oman. He debuted in the tournament in a 1– win over Syria on 26 September 2022.

References

External links 

 Svenskfotboll profile

1998 births
Living people
People from Borås
Iraqi footballers
Iraq international footballers
Swedish footballers
Swedish people of Iraqi descent
Superettan players
Norrby IF players
Dalkurd FF players
Association football defenders